Cerro Uritorco is a mountain (cerro) located next to the Calabalumba River, in the city of Capilla del Monte, in the northwest of the province of Córdoba, Argentina. It is the highest peak of the Sierras Chicas mountain range. It is 3 km (1.9 miles) away from the city center and its summit is at 1,949 m (6,394 ft) above mean sea level. The name Uritu urqu means "Male Hill" in Santiago del Estero Quichua, which is, however, not the aboriginal Comechingón language.

Cerro Uritorco is under a private administration and it can be accessed by the public for a fee. It is considered a medium-difficulty ascent, taking around three hours to reach the top, provided the appropriate hiking path is followed.

On December 21, 2012, the mountain was closed, since a mass suicide had been proposed on Facebook to take place there due to the 2012 phenomenon.

The mountain is believed to be a center of extraterrestrial activity and home to an underground city named Erks, which is inhabited by extraterrestrial beings. The mysticism around the alleged UFO activity in the mountain and its surroundings have made the area a popular landmark in the province of Córdoba.

References

External links
 Cerro Uritorco (non official website)

Mountains of Argentina
Landforms of Córdoba Province, Argentina
2012 phenomenon